The 2014 FIA Formula 3 European Championship was a multi-event motor racing championship for single-seat open wheel formula racing cars that held across Europe. The championship featured drivers competing in two-litre Formula Three racing cars built by Italian constructor Dallara which conformed to the technical regulations, or formula, for the championship. It was the third edition of the FIA Formula 3 European Championship. Raffaele Marciello was the reigning drivers' champion, but he did not defend his title as he stepped up to the GP2 Series. His team, Prema Powerteam represented in the Teams' championship by Esteban Ocon and Antonio Fuoco, defended their Teams' title.

Ocon clinched both the main and rookie championship titles after nine race wins. Jagonya Ayam with Carlin driver Tom Blomqvist finished as runner-up, securing six wins, while Van Amersfoort Racing driver Max Verstappen, who made his début in single-seaters, collected ten wins and finished just nine points behind Blomqvist. Lucas Auer, who raced for kfzteile24 Mücke Motorsport, won races at Hockenheim and the Nürburgring to finish fourth in the championship. Fuoco achieved wins at Silverstone and Spielberg and completed the top five in the championship. His compatriot Antonio Giovinazzi was a winner of races at Spielberg and the Nürburgring, while series veteran Felix Rosenqvist was the only other driver to win a race, triumphing at the Pau Grand Prix meeting.

Drivers and teams
The following teams and drivers competed during the 2014 season:

 Signature was scheduled to enter the season with Renault engines and Tatiana Calderón and Óscar Tunjo as their drivers, but cancelled the plan on the eve of the opening round. Calderón later signed for Jo Zeller Racing, while the team returned at the penultimate round of the season using Volkswagen engines.

Calendar

A provisional eleven-round calendar was announced on 4 December 2013. The series returned to Pau after a one-year absence, as the previously-scheduled British F3 event in 2013 was cancelled, after a restructure of the championship calendar.

Results

Championship standings
Scoring system

Drivers' championship
(key)

† — Drivers did not finish the race, but were classified as they completed over 90% of the race distance.

Rookies' championship

Teams' championship
Prior to each round of the championship, two drivers from each team – if applicable – were nominated to score teams' championship points.

Footnotes

References

External links

FIA Formula 3 European Championship
FIA Formula 3 European Championship
FIA Formula 3 European Championship
Formula 3